Aleksandar Mihaylov (born 13 August 1998) is a Bulgarian footballer who plays as a right back.

Career

Cherno More
On 21 September 2016, Mihaylov made his first team début in a 2–1 away win against Rozova Dolina in the Bulgarian Cup, coming on as substitute for Plamen Nikolov.  He made his league début on 31 May 2017, coming on as substitute for Filip Hlúpik in the 2–2 away draw with Levski Sofia.

Career statistics

References

External links

1998 births
Living people
Sportspeople from Varna, Bulgaria
Bulgarian footballers
Association football defenders
First Professional Football League (Bulgaria) players
PFC Cherno More Varna players